Frank Le Moyne Mills (May 13, 1895 – August 31, 1983) was a Major League Baseball catcher who played for one season. He played for the Cleveland Naps for four games during the 1914 season.

External links

1895 births
1983 deaths
Major League Baseball catchers
Cleveland Naps players
Baseball players from Ohio
Atlanta Crackers players